Anilda Thomas (born 6 May 1993) is an Indian sprinter who specialises in the 400 metres event. She participated in the 2016 Summer Olympics in the women's 4 × 400 metres relay event.

Thomas was part of the Indian team that qualified for the Olympics in the women's 4 × 400 metres relay event. The quartet of Thomas, Nirmala Sheoran, M. R. Poovamma and Tintu Lukka clocked 3:27.88 at Bangalore in July 2016, finishing with the 12th best time in the world as top 16 relay teams qualified for the Olympics.

References

External links
 

1993 births
Living people
Indian female sprinters
21st-century Indian women
21st-century Indian people
People from Ernakulam district
Sportswomen from Kerala
Olympic athletes of India
Athletes (track and field) at the 2016 Summer Olympics
Commonwealth Games competitors for India
Athletes (track and field) at the 2014 Commonwealth Games
Olympic female sprinters